The Texas Sphinx is a 1917 American silent Western film, featuring Harry Carey and released by Universal Pictures.

Cast
 Harry Carey
 Hoot Gibson
 Ed Jones
 Alice Lake
 William Steele credited as William Gettinger
 Vester Pegg

See also
 Harry Carey filmography
 Hoot Gibson filmography

External links
 

1917 films
1917 Western (genre) films
1917 short films
American silent short films
American black-and-white films
Films directed by Fred Kelsey
Silent American Western (genre) films
1910s American films